Veltrusy Mansion (Czech: Zámek Veltrusy) is a baroque château in Veltrusy, Bohemia, located in the Mělník District of the Czech Republic. The mansion is situated near the banks of the Vltava River, about 25 km north of Prague. The mansion is open to the public for visits.

The mansion was initially built in 1716 by architect František Maxmilián Kaňka for Count Václav Antonín Chotek of Chotkov and Vojnín. The original mansion was extended in 1764 by architect Giovanni Battista Alliprandi on the orders of Count Rudolf Chotek of Chotkov and Vojnín, who also commissioned the interior decoration. Further extensions and the annexes of the mansion were constructed in 1804.

References
 Veltrusy

External links 
 
 Veltrusy Mansion website (in Czech)
 Zámek Veltrusy website (in Czech)

Veltrusy
Veltrusy
Veltrusy
Mělník District
Buildings and structures in the Central Bohemian Region
National Cultural Monuments of the Czech Republic
1716 establishments in the Holy Roman Empire